Monvalle is a comune (municipality) in the Province of Varese in the Italian region of Lombardy, located about  northwest of Milan and about  west of Varese.

Monvalle borders the following municipalities: Besozzo, Leggiuno.

Population trend

References

Cities and towns in Lombardy